For the North American market, the Honda Odyssey, is a minivan manufactured and marketed by Japanese automaker Honda since 1994, now in its fifth generation, which began in 2018.

The Odyssey had originally been conceived and engineered in Japan, in the wake of the country's economic crisis of the 1990s – which in turn imposed severe constraints on the vehicle's size and overall concept, dictating the minivan's manufacture in an existing facility with minimal modification. The result was a smaller minivan, in the compact MPV class, that was well received in the Japanese domestic market and less well received in North America. The first generation Odyssey was marketed in Europe as the Honda Shuttle.

Subsequent generations diverged to reflect market variations, and Honda built a plant in Lincoln, Alabama, United States, incorporating the ability to manufacture larger models. Since model year 1999, Honda has marketed a larger (large MPV-class) Odyssey in North America and a smaller Odyssey in Japan and other markets. Honda also offered the larger North American Odyssey in Japan as the LaGreat (ラグレイト, Ragureito) beginning in June 1999 through 2005. Both versions of the Odyssey were sold in Japan at Honda Clio dealership locations. Both versions of the Odyssey are currently sold in the Middle East.

First generation (RA; 1994) 

The 1995 Odyssey was introduced in 1994 as Honda's first minivan — based on the Accord platform, with a 4-cylinder engine, all-disc anti-lock braking, all wishbone suspension, and a four-speed automatic transmission with a steering-column-mounted shifter and a hill-hold feature, marketed as  Grade Logic. This class of vehicles would subsequently become known as Compact MPV. The design featured unibody construction, dual airbags, dual gloveboxes, dual zone heating and cooling with 20 percent greater capacity than an Accord's system (overhead rear fan-speed adjustment control, and main control switch over the front-seat passenger), conventional rear swing-open rather than sliding doors, and a third row seat that could fold and tumble into a compartment beneath the floor — the spacesaver spare tire carried inside, on the right, rear wall of the cabin.

Honda marketed the first-generation Odyssey in two trim levels. The LX accommodated seven passengers with two front buckets, a removable three-seat middle bench, and a 2-seat third row bench. The EX accommodated six passengers (using two removable second row captain's chairs in lieu of the bench) and offered additional equipment including a roof rack, alloy wheels, power driver's seat height adjustment, power moonroof, remote keyless entry system, fog lights (later model years), body-colored side moldings and mirrors, map lights, and 200-watt AM/FM/cassette six-speaker audio system.

Isuzu offered a rebadged version of the Odyssey from 1996 to 1999 as the Isuzu Oasis.

Development

The Odyssey was engineered by Kunimichi Odagaki, then a chief engineer at the Honda's Research and Development Center, along with a team of 20 members — in the wake of Japan's recession of the early 1990s and the possibility of a 25-percent tariffs if the minivans were imported to the U.S. as light trucks. In the course of developing the Odyssey, it became paramount to circumvent these obstacles and conceive a feasible interior package that could use existing manufacturing facilities with minimal investment.

Odagaki traveled to the U.S. in September 1990 with a small sub-team to conduct a review of the U.S. minivan market. At the project's inception, the team was considering variations for the project from 4-cylinder to V6 alternatives, when the project was canceled.

Odagaki continued working with an "underground" team, using as its design credo the concept of a "personal jet" — which in turn led to the car's original PJ concept code-name. Odagaki conceived the idea of the third-row seat folding into a floor compartment, and he worked with his team to include a "center aisle." The team determined a minimum interior height of 1.2 meters to retain the aisle and favored a design with a low floor — to provide ease of passenger entry and exit, easy garage-ability, low roof-loading height, as well as enhanced productivity on the assembly line.

The team worked to convince management of the project's viability, using extensive illustrations, a one-quarter scale model and a full-size foam model. By April 1991, Odagaki won permission to develop a prototype.

After bringing the right-hand drive prototype to the U.S., Odagaki won the support of American Honda. Production was officially launched on October 20, 1994 — the first Honda model in to be released at the same time through Honda's three Japanese distribution channels (Primo, Clio, Verno), marketing the Odyssey through the three channels under the same name.

In addition to being named after the epic, it also shares its name with a series of Honda ATVs, the re-using of Honda Motorcycle trademarks being a common way of naming new cars. The Odyssey name was previously considered for a new SUV, but the focus group found the journey themed name puzzling and was named the Honda Passport instead.

At its debut, the Odyssey won the Japan Car of the Year Award (Special Category) and the RJC New Car of the Year Award. By September 1997, the Odyssey had sold more than 300,000 units, becoming Honda's fastest-selling new car and breaking the Civic's record.

Taxi service
In 1996, New York City's Taxi and Limousine Commission (TLC) expanded the number of licensable automobiles, approving the first generation Odyssey for use in the city's taxi fleet — the Odyssey having been recommended by the seven-year-old grandson of a TLC advisory commission member. Initial test riders identified advantages over then-prevalent Chevrolet Caprice and the Ford Crown Victoria taxi models — including greater height (for a better view of the road), headroom, rear legroom, rear footroom (the front-wheel-drive Odyssey having a flat floor) and cargo space over the sedans, as well as air-conditioning vents in the rear, which the sedans did not offer.

Isuzu Oasis

The Isuzu Oasis is a minivan marketed in the United States by Isuzu from 1996 to 1999 as a rebadged variant of the first-generation Honda Odyssey, the only minivan marketed by Isuzu.

By agreement, Honda rebadged the Isuzu Rodeo and Isuzu Trooper as the Honda Passport and Acura SLX, respectively. In turn, Isuzu rebadged the Honda Odyssey, the Honda Accord and Honda Domani vehicles — marketed respectively as the Isuzu Oasis, the Isuzu Aska and Isuzu Gemini.

After the Honda Odyssey was redesigned for 1999, Isuzu continued to market the Oasis with minor changes. Later Oasis models came with a 2.3L VTEC engine similar to the engine found in the sixth generation Honda Accord.

Second generation (RL1; 1999) 

The second generation North American market Odyssey was first assembled in Canada as a 1999 model mainly for North America between 1998 and 2004 — and exported to Japan as the LaGreat between 1999 and 2004. The television ad campaign for the new Odyssey evoked moments from the film 2001: A Space Odyssey, particularly the extended space-station docking and lunar landing sequences to the soundtrack of The Blue Danube waltz.

By its second generation, the Odyssey was considerably larger than its predecessor, and adopted sliding rear doors instead of hinged ones, simpler front strut suspension in place of upper and lower control arm front suspension of the 1995–1998 model, and a  V6 engine instead of the original four-cylinder. The Odyssey offered two sliding doors as standard equipment, whereas some minivans of the time only offered one, a second door being optional on lower trims. It offered power sliding doors for the EX trim and manual ones for the base LX trim. It kept the fold-into-the-floor rear seat, an innovation adopted by many other minivans. This generation also introduced the Honda Satellite-Linked Navigation System as an option for the EX trim, which became the first navigation system ever offered in any minivan or Honda vehicle. However, the power moonroof from the previous generation's EX trim was removed. 

The 2004 model was the only second generation Odyssey model year to receive reliability ratings of five out of five according to Automotive Information Systems. IIHS gave the Odyssey a Good rating in the Frontal Offset Test from 1999 to 2004.

The second generation was praised for its powerful V6, its handling from its four-wheel independent suspension, and its features such as a large cabin, power sliding doors (manual sliding doors on LX models) and the stow-away third-row seat. Some found it noisier than competitors. It won consecutive Edmunds.com Editors' Most Wanted awards from 1999 to 2003 in the minivan category.

This is also the only generation of the Honda Odyssey where the power windows are only on the driver's and front passenger's doors.

2002 facelift

Some major upgrades included the addition of a third trim, EX-L, introducing leather seats to the Odyssey for the very first time, as well as VHS and DVD-based entertainment system options for EX-L models without navigation. Also added was a five-speed automatic transmission, side torso airbags (not side curtain airbags), rear disc brakes, and a few minor cosmetic improvements on the outside as well as the inside. Other than an automatic power driver's window, the Odyssey remained unchanged for 2003 and 2004, before being replaced with the third generation model.

Transmission problems
The 4-speed automatic transmission in 1999 to 2001 models had serious problems with transmission durability. Honda spokesman Mike Spencer stated that four-speed models were afflicted with a bad bearing that could break apart, scattering fragments of metal that clogged fluid passageways in the transmission, causing it to shift erratically. Canada is not included. The five-speed automatic was first installed in the Odyssey for the 2002 model, but general reliability of the 1999–2003 transmission was poor according to Consumer Reports. Spencer said that the five-speed models typically were damaged by premature wear of the third-gear clutch pack. As the clutch friction material abraded, it scattered bits inside the transmission case, clogging fluid lines and causing erratic shifting. Drivers might suffer slipping, poor or no shifts, or sudden down-shifts from fifth gear to second gear.

Under some conditions, a different 5-speed transmission problem arose. Second gear could overheat and break, causing the transmission to lock. An oil jet was added to lubricate this gear but this did not solve the third gear clutch problem. The addition of the Honda transmission cooler with the towing package still allows transmission fluid temperatures that are too high. But it was required along with a power steering cooler for any towing, or the warranty would be void. The Acura CL, TL, MDX, and Honda Accord suffered similar problems.

Third generation (RL3/4; 2005) 

Honda introduced the third generation Odyssey for the 2005 model year. It grew in width and weight but retained the previous generation's length and interior space.

Honda introduced the ACE body engineering to the third generation Odyssey, which was later used on the eighth generation Civic. Side-curtain airbags and electronic stability control are included in all models. Both features were previously unavailable.

This generation returned the power moonroof to the Odyssey on the EX-L trim. Additional features included integrated sunshades in the rear doors, windows that roll down in the second row, and the third row 'Magic Seat' was changed from a straight bench design to a split 60/40 design to allow for variable folding. The headrests could now be left in place when tumbling the rear seat. Some notable features of the redesign were dual glove boxes and an in-floor lazy susan storage compartment, located in the previous generation's spare tire well. Third generation models offered a dashboard-mounted shifter, instead of a column-mounted shifter. The second row bucket seats do not fold into the floor. A 'Plus-One' jump seat was standard on EX models and above for an eighth passenger. Touring models came with a center storage compartment.

This enabled this van to receive U.S. Environmental Protection Agency (EPA) fuel economy ratings of / for the 2005 model year. (/ for non VCM equipped LX and EX models.) These numbers were re-rated in 2007, bringing numbers to 17/25 for VCM equipped models, and 16/23 for non VCM equipped models. Acceleration was slightly slower than generation two models. It was rated top pick in minivan category in Consumer Reports 2005 annual auto issue.

The EX-L trim could be upgraded with either a rear entertainment system or a rear entertainment and navigation system bundle, while the Touring trim could only be upgraded with the bundle until 2006. The VHS-based i-VES system was dropped. Four trim levels were available in the United States: LX, EX, EX-L, and Touring, the top-of-the-line package in the Odyssey lineup that incorporated features such as special "Touring" badging on the right side of the back door, run-flat tires, power tailgate, power adjustable pedals, memory seats, and chrome tailgate and sliding door interior handle trim.

The 2006 model year moved the "Odyssey" logo from the right side of the back door to the left side, added a leather steering wheel and shift knob to the EX-L which was previously available only on the Touring, and made the rear entertainment system a standard feature on the Touring.

Starting with the 2007 model year, a revised, more robust 5-speed transmission from the Honda Ridgeline was introduced to the Odyssey in an effort to further improve transmission reliability.

Problem areas included body integrity, which includes paint wear and rusting, body hardware bumpers being loose, audio system, brakes and suspension according to the Consumer Reports issue of April 2006. According to the online edition of Consumer Reports in June 2016, transmission problems were better than average for 2006 models. Crash test ratings have been five star in every test but the 2005 had a safety concern. "During the side impact test, the driver door became unlatched and opened. A door opening during a side impact crash increases the likelihood of occupant ejection."

The Odyssey won a spot on Car and Driver's 5 Best Trucks for the past three years, as well as a host of other awards. It was the top-ranked minivan in the US News charts. The 2007–09 Odyssey was the best-selling minivan in the United States.

2008 facelift

For the 2008 model year, the Odyssey received a facelift. All models were equipped with active front head restraints, daytime running lights, and a redesigned dashboard, grille, and tail lights. An audio AUX jack became standard equipment. The backup camera, previously only included with navigation-equipped models, was integrated into the rear-view mirror of the non-navigation EX-L. Touring models featured full Bluetooth support for all Bluetooth-equipped devices, made navigation a standard feature, and updated the design and font of the special badging to the one still used as of the fifth generation. EX, EX-L, and Touring models came standard with the updated 'Plus One' jump seat with added storage features. Automatic climate control for the rear seats, a Touring feature, was expanded to non-Touring models equipped with a tri-zone climate control system.

EX-L and Touring models received a revised version of the existing J35A7 engine with VCM now also present on one cylinder in the front bank for running on 3 or 4 cylinders depending on engine load.

In Canada, an entry-level DX trim was added alongside the LX, EX, EX-L, and Touring trims for the 2008–10 model years. The DX lacks features such as the "Second-Row Plus One Seat with storage", conversation mirror with sunglasses holder, tinted glass, roof rails, and has black body moldings. In Canada, the LX trim was dropped for the 2010 model year, and an SE Odyssey NHL edition replaced the EX (being identical to the 2008–09 EX in all respects but with a rear entertainment system and NHL badges). In the United States for the 2010 model year, the DVD rear entertainment system was added as an option for the EX trim alongside the EX-L. The Michelin PAX run-flat tire system which was previously standard on Touring models was made optional on 2008-2009 Tourings before ultimately being discontinued entirely for 2010.

Fourth generation (RL5; 2011)

Honda presented the 2011 Odyssey Concept in early 2010 at the Chicago Auto Show and officially released it for sale on June 17, 2010; with a larger, wider body, a lower roofline and revised styling.

Compared to its predecessor, the fourth generation Odyssey is  longer,  wider and  lower. The body is constructed using 59% high strength steel, ranging from 390 to 1,500 MPa yield strength. Trim levels included the LX, EX, EX-L, Touring, and Touring Elite. The Touring Elite trim level was new for this generation.

The fourth generation Odyssey introduced options including 12-speaker 650 watt audio system (Touring Elite), a voice-controlled satellite GPS and HDD navigation system with XM NavTraffic (Touring and above, available EX-L), an external HDMI input (Touring Elite), a larger  split-screen rear-seat DVD entertainment system (Touring Elite), a "cool box" chilled by the air conditioning (EX-L and above), a stowable 3rd row 60/40 split bench seat, a removable first row center console (EX and above), and a new steering wheel shared with the eighth-generation Accord.

The fourth generation Odyssey includes projector headlamps or HID xenon low-beam headlamps (Touring Elite), standard 17-inch wheels, 18-inch alloy wheels (Touring and above), and 6-speed automatic transmission (Touring and above). A Blind Spot Display for the driver's side and a multi-angle backup camera is available.

All Odyssey models have a 3.5 L J35Z8 V6 that makes  at 5700 rpm and 250 lb⋅ft (339 N⋅m) of torque at 4800 rpm. Variable Cylinder Management (VCM) became standard on all models unlike its predecessor, which included VCM on EX-L and Touring models only. The version of VCM with 3-, 4-, and 6-cylinder modes that was introduced with the 2008 Odyssey continued to be used with the fourth generation Odyssey.

2014 facelift

For the 2014 model year, the Odyssey received a refresh. Changes included the previously Touring-exclusive 6-speed automatic transmission becoming standard on all trims, sleeker exterior styling with a new aluminum hood, aluminum front fenders, twin-bar grille and revised lower front fascia with optional integrated fog lights, darker-finish projector headlight housings, Smart entry availability and LED rear tail light bars. A built-in vacuum cleaner system is included with the Touring Elite model, which receives special "Elite" badging to distinguish it from the non-Elite Touring models. The revised suspension uses aluminum front lower control arms. The 2014 Odyssey went on sale on July 2, 2013.

Honda's i-MID, also available on the Civic and Accord, became standard equipment in 2014 models; all models now got standard Pandora Internet Radio capabilities, Bluetooth Hands-Free Link, iPod, iPhone, USB integration and a color display screen.

New safety features included in the refresh include a LaneWatch camera housed in the passenger side-view mirror or a Blind Spot Monitoring system. Forward Collision Warning (FCW) and Lane Departure Warning (LDW) are also available while a single-angle backup camera with dynamic guidelines became standard equipment.

The SE trim positioned between EX and EX-L, was initially limited to the Canadian market but was made available in the US by the 2016 model year. New exterior paint colors were made available in 2014, as are new interior fabrics and trim pieces.

Safety
The Insurance Institute for Highway Safety (IIHS) found the Odyssey to have the lowest overall driver death rate in its class with 0 deaths per million registered years. Beginning with the 2013 model year, all Odysseys came equipped with a rear-view backup camera. For 2014, the front crash structure was upgraded.

IIHS

* first minivan to earn IIHS Top Safety Pick+ award

NHTSA

Fifth generation (RL6; 2018) 

The fifth generation Odyssey was unveiled at the 2017 North American International Auto Show in January, Honda Manufacturing of Alabama (HMA) began production on April 26, sales followed on May 25 as a 2018 model. A new 10-speed automatic produced at Honda Precision Parts Georgia (HPPG) is Honda's first use of a 10-speed transmission in a production automobile, it is nearly  lighter than the previous 6-speed. Trim levels included LX, EX, EX-L, Touring, and Elite.

Compared to its predecessor, the fifth generation is  narrower,  taller and shares the same  wheelbase. The use of structural body adhesives has increased compared to the 4th gen with  used. High-strength steel comprises 55% of the body. Like the Acura MDX and Pilot, the redesigned Odyssey features a 1500 MPa hot stamped outer front door stiffener ring and forged aluminum front suspension lower control arms.

The Odyssey introduced options including an array of active safety systems packaged under Honda Sensing as standard along with Forward Collision Warning (FCW) and Lane Departure Warning (LDW), Magic Slide second-row seats, as well as CabinTalk and CabinWatch.  The driver's seat is now available with 4-way power adjustable lumbar support.

All Odyssey models come with a 3.5 L J35Y6 V6 that makes  at 6,000 rpm and 262 lb⋅ft (355 N⋅m) of torque at 4,700 rpm. This engine returned to using a version of Variable Cylinder Management (VCM) that only has a 3 cylinder and 6 cylinder mode as opposed to the 3-, 4-, and 6-cylinder modes found in Odysseys from 2008-2017. Like its predecessors, this engine uses a timing belt with scheduled replacement required.

Beginning with 2020, all models come equipped with the previously Touring-exclusive 10-speed automatic transmission, as the ZF 9HP transmission was discontinued.

The 2018 Honda Odyssey received a second Top Safety Pick+ award by the IIHS.

2021 facelift 

For 2021, the Odyssey features a minor restyling that includes a redesigned front grille and tailgate trim and adds 4-way power lumbar adjustability to the front passenger seat alongside perforated leather with contrasting piping options. Honda Sensing is standard on all trims. A rear seat occupant reminder is added to the CabinWatch system to help prevent heatstroke among children. Headlight improvements for the following year's 2022 model makes the 2022 Odyssey an IIHS Top Safety Pick+. 

For 2023, the base LX trim is discontinued, and a new Sport trim is placed between EX-L and Touring which features a sport-styled interior and exterior, with a notable difference that it is the only trim with body-colored door handles, of the first model year and generation of Odysseys since the third generation (2010) Odyssey to have trims with body-colored door handles.

Reception 
At its debut, the Odyssey won the Japan Car of the Year Award (Special Category) and the RJC New Car of the Year Award. By September 1997, the Odyssey had sold more than 300,000 units, becoming Honda's fastest-selling new car and breaking the Civic's record. The Odyssey was Wheels magazine's Car of the Year for 1995. At the Odyssey's European launch, where it was marketed as the Shuttle, British ex-Grand Prix driver Jonathan Palmer described its handling as equal of any "executive sedan".

In a 1995 owner survey, 98% of the respondents rated the Odyssey's handling as above average, 50.3 percent rating engine power to be good — and 25 percent wanted a more powerful engine. A later review of the first generation Odyssey summarized the minivan's market reception:

Awards and recognition
The Odyssey has received numerous awards since its inception, winning both Car and Driver's "5 Best Trucks" and Consumer Reports' "Top Pick Minivan" several times.

Export vehicle
In the middle of 2012, Honda began exporting the fourth generation North American Odyssey minivan to the Philippines. Export of the Odyssey to that market ceased in 2015 after the introduction of the international fifth generation Odyssey which is imported from Japan.

A version of the second generation North American Odyssey was sold in Japan as the Honda LaGreat.

The Odyssey manufactured at HMA in Alabama has also been exported to Canada, Mexico, South America, South Korea, and the Middle East.

Sales

References

 Issue of Nov 2003 of Car and Driver HK

External links

 Official U.S. Site
 Original design presentation drawings for the first-generation Honda Odyssey

Odyssey
Cars introduced in 1994
2000s cars
2010s cars
2020s cars
Minivans
Front-wheel-drive vehicles
Motor vehicles manufactured in the United States